Faranah (N’ko: ߝߙߊߣߊ߫߫) is a prefecture located in the Faranah Region of Guinea. The capital is Faranah. The prefecture covers an area of 12,966 km2 and has an estimated population of 280,511.

Sub-prefectures
The prefecture is divided administratively into 12 sub-prefectures:
 Faranah-Centre
 Banian
 Beindou
 Gnaléah
 Hérémakonon
 Kobikoro
 Marela
 Passayah
 Sandéniah
 Songoyah
 Tindo
 Tiro

Prefectures of Guinea
Faranah Region